Ramaria caulifloriformis is a species of coral fungus in the family Gomphaceae. It was first described in 1956 as Clavaria caulifloriformis by Chester Leathers from collections made near Topinabee, Michigan. It was transferred into the genus Ramara in 1970 by E.J.H. Corner. Spores are ellipsoid, verrucose (covered with warts or wartlike projections), and measure 8–10 by 4–5 µm.

References

External links

Fungi described in 1956
Fungi of the United States
Gomphaceae
Fungi without expected TNC conservation status